Alberto Domínguez Lorenzo (born 2 April 1978) is a Spanish rower. He competed in the men's lightweight coxless four event at the 2004 Summer Olympics.

Notes

References

External links
 
 

1978 births
Living people
Spanish male rowers
Olympic rowers of Spain
Rowers at the 2004 Summer Olympics
People from Avilés